Guam Shipyard  is a top level association football club that currently plays in the Guam Soccer League in the United States territory of Guam. The team have won three national cups and hold the record for the most league championships.

Squad

Honors
Guam Soccer League (9):

As Continental Micronesia G-Force: 1995, 1996
As Coors Light Silver Bullets 1999, 2000, 2001 (fall league won as Staywell Zoom)
As Guam Shipyard: 2002, 2003, 2005, 2006

Guam FA Cup (4):

 As Guam Shipyard: 2010, 2012, 2015, 2017

References

Football clubs in Guam
1997 establishments in Guam
Association football clubs established in 1997